Meyer Lansky (born Maier Suchowljansky; July 4, 1902 – January 15, 1983), known as the "Mob's Accountant", was an American organized crime figure who, along with his associate Charles "Lucky" Luciano, was instrumental in the development of the National Crime Syndicate in the United States.

A member of the Jewish mob, Lansky developed a gambling empire that stretched around the world. He was said to own points (percentages) in casinos in Las Vegas, Cuba, The Bahamas and London. Lansky additionally had a strong influence with the Italian-American Mafia and played a large role in the consolidation of the criminal underworld. The full extent of this role has been the subject of some debate, as Lansky himself denied many of the accusations against him.

Despite nearly 50 years as a member/participant in organized crime, Lansky was never found guilty of anything more serious than illegal gambling. He has a legacy of being one of the most financially successful gangsters in American history. Before he fled Cuba, he was said to be worth an estimated $20 million (equivalent to $ million in ). When he died in 1983, his family learned that his estate was only worth around US$57,000.

Early life
Maier Suchowljansky was born on July 4, 1902, in Grodno, Russian Empire (now Belarus), to a Polish-Jewish family who experienced antisemitism and pogroms from Imperial authorities. When asked about his native country, Lansky always responded "Poland". In 1911, Lansky emigrated to the United States through the port of Odessa with his mother and brother Jacob, and joined his father, who had immigrated in 1909, and settled on the Lower East Side of Manhattan, New York.

Lansky met Benjamin "Bugsy" Siegel when they were children. They became lifelong friends, as well as partners in the bootlegging trade, and together managed the Bugs and Meyer Mob, with its reputation as one of the most violent Prohibition gangs. Lansky was also close friends with Charles "Lucky" Luciano; the two met as teenagers when Luciano attempted to extort Lansky for protection money on his walk home from school. Luciano respected the younger boy's defiant responses to his threats, and the two formed a lasting partnership thereafter.  The two of them would go on to associate with veteran gangster Arnold Rothstein, up until his murder in 1928.

Luciano had a vision to form a national crime syndicate in which the Italian, Jewish, and Irish gangs could pool their resources and turn organized crime into a lucrative business for all – an organization he founded after a conference in Atlantic City organized by himself, Lansky, Johnny Torrio, and Frank Costello in May 1929.<ref>Howard Abadinsky, Organized Crime," Cengage Learning, 2009, p. 115</ref>

Gambling operations

By 1936, Lansky had established gambling operations in Florida, New Orleans, and Cuba. These gambling operations were successful as they were founded upon two innovations:

 First, Lansky and his connections had the technical expertise to manage them effectively based upon Lansky's knowledge of the mathematical odds of most popular wagering games.
 Second, mob connections, as well as bribed law enforcement, were used to ensure legal and physical security of their establishments from other crime figures and law enforcement.

There was also an absolute rule of integrity concerning the games and wagers made within their establishments. Lansky's "carpet joints" in Florida and elsewhere were never "clip joints" where gamblers were unsure of whether or not the games were rigged against them. Lansky ensured that the staff administering the games were men of high integrity.

In 1946, Lansky convinced the Italian-American Mafia to place Siegel in charge of Las Vegas, and became a major investor in Siegel's Flamingo Hotel. To protect himself from the type of prosecution which sent Al Capone to prison for tax evasion and prostitution, Lansky transferred the illegal earnings from his growing casino empire to a Swiss bank account, where anonymity was assured by the 1934 Swiss Banking Act. Lansky eventually bought an offshore bank in Switzerland, which he used to launder money through a network of shell and holding companies.

World War II involvement
In the 1930s, Lansky and his gang stepped outside their usual criminal activities to break up rallies held by the pro-Nazi German-American Bund. He recalled a particular rally in Yorkville, a German neighborhood in Manhattan, that he and fourteen other associates disrupted:

"The stage was decorated with a swastika and a picture of Adolf Hitler. The speakers started ranting. There were only fifteen of us, but we went into action. We threw some of them out the windows. Most of the Nazis panicked and ran out. We chased them and beat them up. We wanted to show them that Jews would not always sit back and accept insults".

During World War II, Lansky was also instrumental in helping the Office of Naval Intelligence (ONI)'s Operation Underworld, in which the government recruited criminals to watch out for German infiltrators and submarine-borne saboteurs. Lansky helped arrange a deal with the government via a high-ranking United States Navy official. This deal secured the release of Luciano from prison; in exchange, the Mafia would provide security for the warships that were being built along the docks in New York Harbor. German submarines were sinking Allied ships in great numbers along the eastern seaboard and the Caribbean coast, and there was great fear of attack or sabotage by Nazi sympathizers. Lansky connected the ONI with Luciano, who reportedly instructed Joseph Lanza to prevent sabotage on the New York waterfront.

The Flamingo
Lansky attended a secret meeting in Havana in 1946 to discuss Siegel's management of the Flamingo Hotel, which was running far behind schedule and costing Siegel's Mafia investors a great deal of money. While the other bosses wanted to kill Siegel, Lansky begged them to give his friend a second chance.

Despite this reprieve, Siegel continued to lose money on the Flamingo. A second meeting was then called. By the time this meeting occurred, the casino had turned a small profit. Lansky, with Luciano's support, convinced the other investors to give Siegel more time. When the hotel started losing money again, the other investors decided that Siegel was finished. It is widely believed that Lansky himself was compelled to give the final okay on eliminating Siegel due to his long relationship with him and his stature in the organization.

On June 20, 1947, Siegel was shot and killed in Beverly Hills, California. Twenty minutes after the Siegel hit, Lansky's associates, including Gus Greenbaum and Moe Sedway, walked into the Flamingo and took control of the hotel. According to the FBI, Lansky retained a substantial financial interest in the Flamingo for the next 20 years. Lansky said in several interviews later in his life that if it had been up to him, "Ben Siegel would be alive today".

Siegel's death marked a power transfer in Vegas from New York's Five Families to the Chicago Outfit. Although his role was considerably more restrained than in previous years, Lansky is believed to have both advised and aided Chicago boss Tony Accardo in initially establishing his hold.

Cuba

After World War II, as a reward for his wartime service, Luciano's pandering sentence was commuted to time served. Luciano's release was conditioned on his agreeing not to contest the revocation of his American citizenship and accept deportation to his native Italy. Upon arriving in Italy, Luciano settled in Sicily. He secretly moved to Cuba, where he worked to resume control over Mafia operations. Luciano also ran a number of casinos in Cuba with the sanction of Cuban dictator, Fulgencio Batista. Upon discovering Luciano's presence in Cuba and resumption of criminal activity, the U.S. government pressured the Batista regime into deporting Luciano to Italy.

Batista and Lansky formed a renowned friendship and business relationship that lasted for a decade. During a stay at the Waldorf-Astoria Hotel in New York in the late 1940s, it was mutually agreed upon that, in exchange for kickbacks, Batista would offer Lansky and the Mafia control of the country's casinos and racetracks. Batista would open Havana to large-scale gambling, and his government would match, dollar for dollar, any hotel investment over $1 million, which would include a casino license. Lansky would place himself at the center of Cuba's gambling operations. He immediately called on his associates to hold a summit in Havana.

The Havana Conference was held on December 22, 1946, at the Hotel Nacional. This was the first full-scale meeting of American underworld leaders since the Chicago meeting in 1932. Present were such figures as Joe Adonis, Albert "The Mad Hatter" Anastasia, Frank Costello, Joseph "Joe Bananas" Bonanno, Vito Genovese, Moe Dalitz, Thomas Luchese, from New York; Santo Trafficante Jr. from Tampa; Carlos Marcello from New Orleans; and Stefano Magaddino, Bonanno's cousin from Buffalo. From Chicago there were Accardo and the Fischetti brothers, "Trigger-Happy" Charlie and Rocco; and, representing the Jewish interest, Lansky, Dalitz and "Dandy" Phil Kastel from Florida.

The first to arrive was Luciano, who secretly traveled to Havana with a false passport. Lansky shared with the attendees his vision of a new Havana, profitable for those willing to invest the right sum of money. According to Luciano, the only attendee who ever recounted the events in any detail, he was appointed as kingpin for the mob, to rule from Cuba until such time as he could find a legitimate way back into the U.S. Entertainment at the conference was provided by, among others, Frank Sinatra, who flew to Cuba with his friends, the Fischetti brothers.

In 1952, Lansky offered then-President Carlos Prío Socarrás a bribe of US$250,000 to step down so Batista could return to power. Once Batista retook control of the government in a military coup in March 1952, he quickly put gambling back on track. Batista offered Lansky an annual salary of $25,000 to serve as an unofficial gambling minister. By 1955, he had changed the gambling laws once again, granting a gaming license to anyone who invested $1 million in a hotel or $200,000 in a new nightclub. Unlike the procedure for acquiring gaming licenses in Vegas, this provision exempted venture capitalists from background checks. As long as they made the required investment, they were provided with public matching funds for construction, a ten-year tax exemption and duty free importation of equipment and furnishings. The government would get $250,000 for the license, plus a percentage of the profits from each casino. Cuba's 10,000 slot machines, even the ones that dispensed small prizes for children at country fairs, were to be the province of Batista's brother-in-law, Roberto Fernandez y Miranda, brother of his wife Marta Fernandez Miranda de Batista.

A Cuban army general and government sports director, Fernandez was also given the parking meters in Havana as an extra bonus. Import duties were waived on materials for hotel construction, and Cuban contractors with the right "in" made windfalls by importing much more than was needed and selling the surplus to others for hefty profits. It was rumored that besides the $250,000 to get a license, sometimes more was required under the table. Periodic payoffs were requested and received by corrupt politicians.

Lansky set about reforming the Cabaret Montmartre, which soon became the "in" place in Havana. Lansky also installed a casino into the Hotel Nacional, relying on the support of Batista to overcome objections of other American expatriates, including Ernest Hemingway. Once all the new hotels, nightclubs and casinos had been built, Batista wasted no time collecting his share of the profits. Nightly, the "bagman" for his wife Marta collected 10% of the profits at Trafficante's interests; the Sans Souci cabaret, and the casinos in the Sevilla-Biltmore, Commodoro, Deauville and Capri hotels. Batista's take from the Lansky casinos, his prized Habana Riviera, the Nacional, the Montmartre and others, was said to be 30%. What exactly Batista and his cronies actually received in total in the way of bribes, payoffs and profiteering has never been certified. The slot machines alone contributed approximately US$1 million to the regime's bank account.

Revolution
The 1959 Cuban Revolution and the rise of Fidel Castro changed the climate for mob investment in Cuba. On New Year's Eve 1958, while Batista was preparing to flee to the Dominican Republic, Lansky was celebrating the US$3 million he made in the first year of operations at his 440-room, US$8 million palace, the Habana Riviera. Many of the casinos, including several of Lansky's, were looted and destroyed that night.

On January 8, 1959, Castro marched into Havana and took over, setting up a command post in the Hilton. Lansky had fled the day before. The new Cuban president, Manuel Urrutia Lleó, took steps to close the casinos. In October 1960, Castro nationalized all the island's hotel-casinos and outlawed gambling. This action essentially wiped out Lansky's asset base and revenue streams. With the additional crackdown on casinos in Miami, Lansky was forced to depend on his Las Vegas revenues.

 Post-revolution 
Lansky sought compensation for losses in Cuba from the U.S. government.

Sexual blackmail operations and J. Edgar Hoover
Lansky is credited with having "controlled" compromising pictures of a sexual nature featuring former FBI director, J. Edgar Hoover with his longtime aide, Clyde Tolson. In his book, Official and Confidential: The Secret Life of J. Edgar Hoover, biographer Anthony Summers cites multiple primary sources regarding Lansky's use of blackmail to gain influence with politicians, policemen and judges. One such stage for the acquisition of blackmail materials were orgies held by late attorney and Lansky protégé, Roy Cohn, and liquor magnate, Lewis Rosenstiel, who had lasting ties with the Mafia from his bootleg operations during Prohibition.

The release of FBI files on Lansky revealed extensive monitoring and investigation, which makes it harder to explain why Lansky was not pursued to conviction, unless he successfully evaded it by blackmail. Cohn copied this model of blackmail to control politicians and evade conviction himself.

Attempted emigration and trial
In 1970, Lansky fled to Herzliya Pituah, Israel, to escape federal tax evasion charges in the United States. At the time Israeli law did not permit the extradition of Jews and under the Law of Return, any Jew may legally settle in the State of Israel. The Israeli government reserved discretion to exclude Jews with a criminal past from permanently settling in the country. Two years after his arrival, Lansky was deported back to the U.S. The federal government brought Lansky to trial with the testimony of loan shark Vincent "Fat Vinnie" Teresa. Lansky was acquitted in 1974.

Death
Lansky retired in Miami. Lansky's last years were spent quietly at his home in Miami Beach, Florida. He died of lung cancer on January 15, 1983, aged 80, leaving a widow and three children. On paper, Lansky was worth almost nothing. At the time, the FBI believed he left behind over $300 million in hidden bank accounts, but they never found any money.

Lansky's biographer Robert Lacey describes his financially strained circumstances in the last two decades of his life and his inability to pay for health care for his handicapped son, who eventually died in poverty. For Lacey, there was no evidence "to sustain the notion of Lansky as king of all evil, the brains, the secret mover, the inspirer and controller of American organized crime." He concludes from evidence including interviews with the surviving members of the family that Lansky's wealth and influence had been grossly exaggerated. His second wife's granddaughter told author T.J. English that at the time of his death in 1983, Lansky left only $57,000 in cash, equivalent to $ in  terms. When asked in his later years what went wrong in Cuba, the gangster offered no excuses. "I crapped out," he said. Lansky told people that he had lost almost every penny in Cuba and that he was barely scraping by.

Hank Messick, a journalist for the Miami Herald who had spent years investigating Lansky, said that the key to understanding Lansky lay with the people around him: "Meyer Lansky doesn't own property. He owns people." To him, the FBI and Manhattan District Attorney Robert Morgenthau, the reality was that Lansky had kept large sums of money in other people's names for decades and that keeping very little in his own was nothing new to him.

In 2010, Lansky's daughter Sandra publicly stated that her father had transferred some $15 million to his brother's account sometime in the early 1970s, when Lansky was having problems with the IRS. How much money Lansky was really worth will probably never be known. Since the warming of relations between the United States and Cuba in 2015, Lansky's grandson, Gary Rapoport, has been asking the Cuban government to compensate him for the confiscation of the Riviera hotel that his grandfather built in Havana.

In popular culture
In film
 The character Hyman Roth, portrayed by Lee Strasberg, and certain aspects of the main character Michael Corleone from the film The Godfather Part II (1974), are based on Lansky. In fact, shortly after the premiere in 1974, Lansky phoned Strasberg and congratulated him on a good performance (Strasberg was nominated for an Oscar for his role), but added, "You could've made me more sympathetic." Roth's statement to Corleone that "We're bigger than U.S. Steel" was similar to a quote from Lansky, said to his wife while watching a news story on the Mafia. The character Johnny Ola, Roth's right-hand man, was inspired by Lansky's associate Vincent Alo. Additionally, the character Moe Greene, who was a friend of Roth, is modeled upon Bugsy Siegel. The film reflects real life in that Lansky was denied the Right of Return to Israel and returned to the US to face criminal charges, but invented details regarding Roth's attempts to bribe Latin American dictators for entry to their countries, as well as Roth's ultimate fate.
 In Nicholas Roeg's 1983 film Eureka, based on the story of Sir Harry Oakes, Joe Pesci plays Mayakofsky, a Lansky stand-in looking to expand his gambling empire to the Bahamas.
 Maximilian "Max" Bercovicz, the gangster played by James Woods in Sergio Leone's 1984 film Once Upon a Time in America, was inspired by Lansky.
 In the 1990 Sydney Pollack film Havana starring Robert Redford, Mark Rydell plays Lansky.
 In the 1991 film Bugsy, a biography of Benjamin Siegel, Lansky is a major character, and played by Ben Kingsley, who was nominated for the Academy Award for Best Supporting Actor for his performance.
 In the 1991 film Mobsters, he is played by Patrick Dempsey.
 In the 2002 film Undisputed there is a character called Mendy Ripstein who reveals that he worked for Meyer Lansky.
 In the 2005 film The Lost City, which presents a fictionalized account of Lansky's involvement in Cuba, Meyer Lansky is portrayed by Dustin Hoffman.
 In the 2015 film Legend, Meyer Lansky is referred to many times and sends associate Angelo Bruno, played by Chazz Palminteri, to London.
 In the 2021 film Lansky, based on Lansky's life, Harvey Keitel portrays the aging gangster, while John Magaro portrays him during his younger years.

In television
 In the 1981 NBC miniseries, The Gangster Chronicles, the character of Michael Lasker, played by Brian Benben, was based on Lansky. Because Lansky was still living at the time, the producers derived the "Michael Lasker" name for the character to avoid legal complications.
 In the 1993 revival of The Untouchables, Chicago actor Marc Grapey played Lansky in two episodes.
 In the 1999 made-for-TV movie Lansky, Richard Dreyfuss stars as Lansky, Eric Roberts as Benny Siegel, and Anthony LaPaglia as Lucky Luciano.
 In the HBO series Boardwalk Empire (2010–2014), Meyer Lansky is played by British actor Anatol Yusef in all five seasons.
 In the 2013 TNT series Mob City, Meyer Lansky is played by Patrick Fischler. (Jeff Braine plays a younger Lansky in a flashback sequence.)
 In the 2015 AMC series The Making of the Mob: New York, Meyer Lansky is played by Ian Bell.

In literature
 In the 2010 book of photographs New York City Gangland, Meyer Lansky is seen "loitering" on Little Italy's famed "Whiskey Curb" with partners Benjamin "Bugsy" Siegel, Vincent "Jimmy Blue Eyes" Alo, and waterfront racketeer Eddie McGrath.
 In the 1996 novel The Plan, by Stephen J. Cannell, Lansky and fellow mobster Joseph Alo are involved in putting an anti-Racketeer Influenced and Corrupt Organizations Act presidential candidate into office.
 In Lansky, the 2009 one-act play by Joseph Bologna, Lansky is portrayed by Mike Burstyn.
 In the book Havana by Stephen Hunter, Lansky and Fidel Castro are both main characters.
 In the 2009 novel If The Dead Rise Not by Philip Kerr, the hero, Bernie Gunther, meets Lansky in Havana.
 In the 2009 novel Ride of the Valkyries by Stuart Slade, Meyer Lansky runs Cuba as the head of the Mafia.
 In the 2011 memoir of cocaine cowboy Jon Roberts, American Desperado, Roberts recounts several encounters such as his uncle Joe Riccobono's relationship with Lansky and the eventual asking for Lansky's personal permission to kill his step-son Richard Schwartz on October 12, 1977, in Miami in a revenge plot.
 In the 2011 historical fiction novel, The Devil Himself by Eric Dezenhall, Meyer Lansky coordinates counterespionage operations with the U.S. Navy to prevent Nazi sabotage in New York and helps plan the invasion of Sicily.
 Lansky is a supporting character in The Raiders, Harold Robbins' 1995 follow-up to The Carpetbaggers.
 In the 2015 novel World Gone By, by Dennis Lehane, Lansky is a supporting character and friend to fictional gangster Joe Coughlin. He is mentioned but not seen in the previous novel in the series Live by Night.
 The 2016 book of photographs Organized Crime in Miami, includes previously unpublished photos of Meyer Lansky and his second wife Teddy on their 1949 honeymoon, as well as photographs from Meyer's 80th birthday with his brother Jake, and longtime partners Harry "Nig Rosen" Stromberg, and Vincent "Jimmy Blue Eyes" Alo.
 The 2019 comic book Meyer fictionalizes "one last caper" by the aged, but spry, Lansky, involving a violent chase of a lost cocaine shipment. It is set in 1982 Miami and Florida Keys.

In music
 Wu-Tang Clan affiliated rapper Myalansky derived his stage name from Meyer Lansky.
 Jewish-Israeli musician Sagol 59 released the song "The Ballad Of Meyer Lansky" on his 2011 album Another Passenger. The song chronicles Lansky's life from birth to death, including his time spent in Israel.
Jay-Z refers to Meyer Lansky in the album “American Gangster” in the song “Party Life”

Notes

References

Further reading
 Birmingham, Stephen The Rest of Us. Boston: Little, Brown, 1984
 Cohen, Rich Tough Jews: Fathers, Sons, and Gangster Dreams. Vintage books, 1999
 Colhoun, Jack. Gangsterismo: The United States, Cuba and the Mafia, 1933 to 1966. OR Books, 2013. 
 Conrad, Harold Dear, Muffo: 35 Years in the Fast Lane. New York, Stein and Day, 1982
 Demaris, Ovid The Boardwalk Jungle. Bantam Books, 1986
 Eisenberg, Dennis/Dan, Uri/ Landau, Eli Meyer Lansky: Mogul of the mob. Paddington Press, 1979
 English, T.J. Havana Nocturne: How the Mob Owned Cuba and Then Lost It to the Revolution, William Morrow, 2008/The Havana Mob: Gangster, Gamblers, Showgirls and Revolutionaries in 1950s Cuba, 2007, Mainstream Publishing (UK edition)
 Lacey, Robert: Little man. Meyer Lansky and the Gangster Life. Little, Brown and Company; Boston Toronto London 1991. 
 Lansky, Sandra/Stadiem, William/Pileggi, Nicholas (Foreword) Daughter of the King: Growing up in Gangland. New York, Weinstein Books, 2014. 
 Messick, Hank Lansky. New York, Putnam 1971
 Almog, Oz, Kosher Nostra Jüdische Gangster in Amerika, 1890–1980 ; Jüdisches Museum der Stadt Wien ; 2003, Text Oz Almog, Erich Metz, 
 Piper, Michael Collins Final Judgment: The Missing Link in the JFK Assassination Conspiracy.
 Stephen, Hunter Havana.
 Rubin, Sunny (2011) Mafia Mother-In-Law. Skunkie Enterprises. 

External links

 Meyer Lansky: The Official Site
 Meyer Lansky – Jewish Virtual Library
 'Havana' Revisited: An American Gangster in Cuba NPR'', June 5, 2009
 

 
1902 births
1983 deaths
People from Grodno
People from Grodnensky Uyezd
Belarusian Jews
Jews from the Russian Empire
Emigrants from the Russian Empire to the United States
American people of Belarusian-Jewish descent
Jewish American gangsters
Prohibition-era gangsters
American anti-fascists
American crime bosses
American people convicted of tax crimes
Genovese crime family
History of Clark County, Nevada
Murder, Inc.
People deported from Israel
Criminals from Florida
Jewish anti-fascists
Deaths from lung cancer in Florida
Burials in Florida